Alberta Provincial Highway No. 46, commonly referred to as Highway 46, was a highway in north-central Alberta, Canada connecting Edmonton to Lac La Biche.  It existed between the 1950s and 1970s, and has formed portions of Highways 55 and 63 since the late 1970s.

Route description 
Highway 46 began at Highway 28 west of Radway and travelled north to through Boyle.  North of Boyle, Highway 46 turned east through Grassland and Atmore, ending in Lac La Biche.

History
A portion of the gravel road that later became Highway 46 had been constructed by the late 1930s. Construction of Highway 63 between Atmore and Fort McMurray began in 1962.

Replacement highways

References 

046
046